PABA may refer to:

 Pan Asian Boxing Association, a boxing organization
 Philippine Amateur Baseball Association, the governing body of baseball in the Philippines
 4-Aminobenzoic acid, also known as para-aminobenzoic acid or PABA, an organic compound 
 Barter Island LRRS Airport (ICAO: PABA)
 Paba Upazila, Bangladesh